Dylan Matthews is an American journalist. He is currently a correspondent for Vox, an online media venture.

Professional life

Early writing 
In 2004, at the age of 14, Matthews launched a personal blog on politics and other issues under the name minipundit. Matthews graduated from Hanover High School in Hanover, New Hampshire, in 2008. He went on to Harvard University, where he studied social and political philosophy, and also wrote for The Harvard Crimson.

The Washington Post
Between June 2013 and January 2014, Matthews blogged at the Wonkblog section of The Washington Post, focusing on taxes, budgets, and other elements of US economic and fiscal policy.

In October 2013, Wonkblog journalist Ezra Klein and Matthews spearheaded the launch of "Know More", a new blog under The Washington Post targeted at replicating the viral reach of popular websites such as BuzzFeed. The project's success gained Matthews recognition internally in The Washington Post and externally. Matthews won The Washington Post "Publisher's Award" of October 2013 for his work on Know More. A leaked internal memo from The Washington Post publisher Katharine Weymouth announcing the award stated:

When interviewed about the strategy of the project, Matthews suggested it was primarily about publishing content that would be shared and virally-distributed on Facebook: "The most obvious similarity [to BuzzFeed and Upworthy] there is in targeting Facebook rather than Twitter. If you look at any site that does well socially, there's just a handful that get their traffic from Twitter. Journalists sometimes forget this because we tend to really like Twitter."

Responding to negative comparisons with BuzzFeed, Matthews said: "It really irks me when people act like they're better than BuzzFeed, which is an extremely effective journalism outfit—much better than most at being honestly what people are looking for." Klein also rejected direct comparisons to "clickbait", arguing: "There's this idea that there's this thing called click-bait that everybody wants to click on. If I could figure out what that is and get people to click on good content—my god, what a wonderful thing!"

Vox.com

In late January 2014, Klein and Matthews announced that they, along with Matthew Yglesias and Melissa Bell, would be starting a new online media venture with Vox Media. The venture, named Vox.com, launched in early April 2014, and Matthews wrote his first article for the site in April 2014. The scientific research Matthews reported on in that article turned out to be fraudulent, and 13 months later he wrote a mea culpa article about the fraud and how he was deceived by it. Matthews leads the Vox section Future Perfect, dedicated to effective altruism.

Other writing
Matthews has also written for Salon and The New Republic and has appeared on the now defunct Bloggingheads.tv. His writings have covered basic income, immigration policy, effective altruism, among other topics.

Reception

Matthews was listed as one of "five rising stars under 25" in Politics Daily by Katie Glueck in 2010. Matthews is noted for his use of data visualizations in his publications.

Charity evaluator and effective altruism advocate GiveWell published a conversation with Matthews from when he was still working for The Washington Post Wonkblog section.

In 2016, the Autistic Self Advocacy Network recognized Matthews as the most outstanding autistic journalist of the year by presenting him with the Harriet McBryde Johnson Award for Non-Fiction Writing.

Personal life

In 2017, Matthews donated his kidney for transplantation. He described the experience in a Vox article, in which he also encouraged readers to consider live kidney donation.

Matthews identifies with the effective altruism movement and is a member of Giving What We Can, a community of people who have pledged to give at least 10% of their income to effective charities.

References

Living people
Year of birth missing (living people)
21st-century American journalists
American male bloggers
American bloggers
American male non-fiction writers
American political writers
People on the autism spectrum
People associated with effective altruism
The Harvard Crimson people
Vox (website) people